This is a list of tennis players who have represented the Japan Fed Cup team in an official Fed Cup match. Japan have taken part in the competition since 1964.

Players

References

External links
Japan Tennis Association

Fed Cup
Lists of Billie Jean King Cup tennis players